Theo Foley (2 April 1937 – 26 June 2020) was an Irish footballer and football manager/coach.

He was born in Inchicore, Dublin, Ireland.

Playing career

During his footballing career, he played as a defender for Home Farm, Exeter City, Northampton Town and  Charlton Athletic.

He also appeared nine times for the Republic of Ireland.

Coaching career

In the mid 1970s Foley was assistant manager, then manager, at Charlton Athletic.

This was followed by a spell as assistant manager at Millwall, reserve team coach at Queen's Park Rangers and another spell as assistant manager at Millwall from December 1982 to George Graham.

On 14 May 1986 Foley became assistant manager of Arsenal when Graham was appointed manager. Graham and Foley's focus was on organised defence and strong running resulting in the club winning a League Cup and Football League Title together.

In May 1990 when Graham changed his managerial staff, he appointed Stewart Houston as his number two. Rather than take the reserve team managers job, Foley left Arsenal to manage Northampton Town where he remained for two years.

In April 1993 he became youth team coach at Fulham. He was assistant manager at Southend United from June 1994 until he was dismissed on 10 February 1997. In the summer of 1997, he joined Leeds United to become a scout under George Graham.Football: Back to the old one-two - Foley and Graham together again - The People - 13 December 1998 In July 1998 he became Reserve Team Coach at Tottenham Hotspur, linking up with Graham again three months later when the latter became Spurs manager. Foley remained at the club even after the sackings of both Graham and Stewart Houston in March 2001. However he was made redundant along with several other coaching staff members in July 2003 by Enic in a cost cutting exercise. He did some scouting for Wolves for a time. After this he went into retirement though he was a matchday host for Charlton and in retirement watched Millwall and Arsenal.July 20, 2003 | News of the World.Page: 78.

Author

In October 2018, Foley published his autobiography "Theo Give Us A Ball" which he wrote with his son Paul.

Death
Theo Foley died on 26 June 2020, aged 83.

References

External links
 Theo Foley at NTFC.premiumtv.co.uk

1937 births
2020 deaths
Home Farm F.C. players
League of Ireland players
Burnley F.C. players
Exeter City F.C. players
Northampton Town F.C. players
Northampton Town F.C. managers
Charlton Athletic F.C. players
Millwall F.C. non-playing staff
Arsenal F.C. non-playing staff
Republic of Ireland association footballers
Republic of Ireland international footballers
Republic of Ireland football managers
Association football defenders
Southend United F.C. non-playing staff